Torrence Avenue is a major north–south street in the South Side of Chicago, as well as its southern suburbs. The road runs north from Richton Road in Crete to Steger Road at the Will–Cook county line in Sauk Village. From there, its northern segment begins just west of here. Torrence Avenue continues north, intersecting Interstate 80 (I-80) and I-94 (Kingery Expressway) in Lansing. From here, the road goes north until ending just south of 95th Street (U.S. Route 12 (US 12) and US 20). The road carries Illinois Route 83 (IL 83) from Glenwood Dyer Road in Lynwood to Sibley Boulevard in Calumet City, as well as carrying US 6 from the Kingery Expressway to 159th Street.

Route description
Torrence Avenue begins at Richton Road in Crete. It continues north for just under a mile until ending at Steger Road (the Will–Cook county line).

Torrence Avenue resumes just west of here, still on Steger Road. In Sauk Village, the road intersects US 30 (Lincoln Highway). Further north in Glenwood, Torrence Avenue picks up IL 83 at Glenwood Dyer Road. In Lansing, Torrence Avenue intersects US 6 and I-80/I-94 (Kingery Expressway). At this point, US 6 also follows Torrence Avenue. At 159th Street in Calumet City, US 6 continues west. While still in Calumet City, IL 83 splits off and follows Sibley Boulevard. At 138th Street, Torrence Avenue enters the city of Chicago. Torrence Avenue continues north until 9500 South, where it ends at a cul-de-sac just south of 95th Street (US 12/US 20).

Major intersections

See also

References

Streets in Chicago
U.S. Route 6
Lynwood, Illinois
Lansing, Illinois
Calumet City, Illinois